Legislative Assembly elections were held in Sikkim on 11 April 2019 to elect the 32 members of the tenth Legislative Assembly. The term of the tenth Sikkim Legislative Assembly ended on 27 May 2019.

Schedule of election

Results

Results (Party-wise)
Results were announced on 23 May 2019.

Results by constituency

References

State Assembly elections in Sikkim
2010s in Sikkim
Sikkim